Masum (Innocent) is the name of a Turkish album by Asya. It is her third studio album, released in Turkey in 1999.

Track listing
 "Günaydın" (Goodmorning)
 "Olmadı Yar" (No My Love)
 "Hem Sana Hem Bana" (Both to You and to Me)
 "Pişmanım" (I have Repented) 
 "Canım" (Honey)
 "Masum" (Innocent) 
 "Ben Yokum" 
 "Seve Seve" (Gladly)
 "Hayat Böyle" (Life is This)
 "Gözlerin Hüzün Yeşili" (His Eyes are Melancholic Green)

Music & Lyrics
Mete Özgencil, Emre Irmak, Nilüfer, Nikos Karvelas, Suat Suna, Şehrazat, Gökhan Kırdar, Sadun Ersönmez, Asya, İskender Paydaş, Ümit Sayın

Asya (singer) albums
1999 albums